Pilgrim is a text adventure game by CRL that runs on the Commodore 64 computer.

Plot
After facing a massacre at the wrath of the Silvian army, the player character goes on quest around the land of Meridan to revive the Guardian in order to save the land from the Silvian's carnage.

Gameplay
Most of the text in the screen describe the current whereabouts and situation of the player. The player needs to type in a set of text commands to interact with the location and progress with the quest.

Reception

References

External links

1986 video games
Adventure games
Commodore 64 games
Commodore 64-only games
Video games developed in the United Kingdom